Toluca International Airport, officially Licenciado Adolfo López Mateos International Airport  is an international airport in Toluca, State of Mexico, Mexico. It is part of the Mexico City Metropolitan Airport Group, and it is being improved and promoted to handle some traffic for the city of Toluca, but it also serves as a low-cost carrier airport for Mexico City, serving VivaAerobús and Volaris, but in the past at different times also by Interjet and Aeroméxico. The airport is named after President Adolfo López Mateos.

It is considered as the main alternate airport for Mexico City International Airport since it is only , approximately 30 minutes, away from the Santa Fe financial district. This airport has the second longest runway in Mexico, after the Felipe Ángeles International Airport.

Overview
Construction of the airport began in 1970, as ordered by Jorge Jiménez Cantú, as a reliever airport for the Mexico City metropolitan area. It was inaugurated in 1984.

Toluca went from serving 145,000 passengers in 2002, to 3,200,000 in 2007 and 4,300,000 in 2008. It used to be a hub for Volaris, but the company announced on March 8, 2011, that its hub in Toluca would switch to Guadalajara. Interjet also moved the bulk of its operations to Mexico City. As a result, the passenger traffic got significantly reduced: from 1,161,064 passengers in 2013 to 134,305 in 2021.

The airport was reduced from four terminals to two after all domestic operations were handled at the Domestic Terminal. Before 2007, Interjet and Volaris had each one independent terminal, plus Terminal 1 (now Domestic Terminal) and the International Terminal. Recent renovations have expanded both the terminals and apron, making the airport capable of handling an excess of 6 million passengers each year.

Among the airlines that used to frequent Toluca were Aeroméxico Connect, Click Mexicana, Republicair and TAESA Airlines. The airport had service to the United States by Continental Express (later United Express) and Spirit Airlines. Service to Spain from Toluca was also offered by Air Madrid in the early 2000s.

In 2022, the airport restarted commercial services.

Airlines and Destinations

Passenger

Cargo

Statistics

Passengers

Top destinations

Transportation 
A shuttle to Tecnológico station for the Toluca–Mexico City commuter rail will be provided when service commences in 2022.

See also

List of the busiest airports in Mexico

References

External links

 AMAIT 
 Toluca International Airport

Airports in the State of Mexico
Toluca